SEACOM is a telephone submarine cable linking Hong Kong with Malaysia.

Its telephone link was opened in 1967.

At one stage it also included the terrestrial radio microwave analogue link along the eastern coast of Australia, operated by the Postmaster-General's Department which was the forerunner of Telstra. This communication link rejoined the undersea cable section at Cairns in north Queensland.

Notes

See also
 SEACOM (African cable system)

Submarine communications cables in the Pacific Ocean
China–Malaysia relations
1967 establishments in Hong Kong
1967 establishments in Malaysia